National parks are a class of protected areas in Sri Lanka and are administered by the Department of Wildlife Conservation. National parks are governed by the Fauna and Flora Protection Ordinance (No. 2) of 1937 and may be created, amended or abolished by ministerial order. All of the land in national parks are state-owned and the entire habitat is protected. Activities prohibited in national parks include hunting, killing or removing any wild animal; destroying eggs/nests of birds and reptiles; disturbing of wild animals; interfering in the breeding of any animal; felling/damaging of any plant; breaking up land for cultivation/mining/other purpose; kindling/carrying of fire; and possessing/using any trap/explosive/poison to damage animal or plant life. Visitors are allowed to enter national parks but only for the purpose of observing flora and fauna and with a permit.

National parks

References

External links

 Department of Wildlife Conservation, Sri Lanka

Sri Lanka
 
National parks
National parks